The River Ogden is a minor river in Lancashire, England.

Beginning on the moors of Haslingden Grane as Ogden Brook, it heads east, feeding Ogden and Calf Hey Reservoirs. It then passes through the Holden Wood Reservoir and collects Swinnel Brook in an area historically known as the Trippet of Ogden, becoming the River Ogden. Turning to the south, it passes through the Helmshore part of Haslingden where it is met by Musbury Brook and then Alden Brook, overlooked by Musbury Tor. Heading southeast it joins the River Irwell at Irwell Vale, between Rawtenstall and Ramsbottom near .

Tributaries

Alden Brook
Musbury Brook
Hare Brook
Long Grain Water
Swinnel Brook
Sunny Field Brook ?
Duckworth Brook
Sherfin Brook
Deep Brook
Hog Lowe Brook

References

Notes

Citations

Ogden, River
Rivers of the Borough of Rossendale
1Ogden